In Mande mythology, Faro purified the earth by sacrificing himself to atone for his twin Pemba's sin.

References

Mandé mythology